Mnenia is an administrative ward in the Kondoa District of the Dodoma Region of Tanzania. In 2016 the Tanzania National Bureau of Statistics report there were 12,529 people in the ward, from 11,528 in 2012.

References 

Kondoa District
Wards of Dodoma Region